Eriorhynchidae is a family in the order Trombidiformes described by Qin & Halliday, 1997. There have been observations along the East Coast of Australia.

Genus
Eriorhynchus

References 

Trombidiformes
Arachnid families